Leather Corduroys is an American hip hop group from Chicago, Illinois. It consists of Kami (sometimes stylized as KAMI) and Joey Purp. They are part of the Savemoney crew. It was described by HipHopDX as "a group intent on busting through limitations within the genre while simultaneously exploring its outer frontiers."

History
In 2014, Leather Corduroys released an EP, titled Porno Music Volume II: TSFR, which received a favorable review from Chicago Reader. In 2015, the duo released the first studio album, Season. The music video for "Lucile", a song off of the album, was directed by Jake Osmun. In that year, Leather Corduroys also released "Have U Eva", a single featuring rapper Vic Mensa.

Discography

Albums
Season (2015)
YOU AND THE MONEY (2022)

EPs
Porno Music Volume II: TSFR (2014)

Singles
"Dat Strong" (2014)
"Have U Eva" (2015)

Guest appearances
Towkio - "Sh!t 2.0" from Hot Chips n Chop Stix (2014)
Towkio - "God in Me" from .Wav Theory (2015)

References

External links

American musical duos
American hip hop groups
Musical groups from Chicago